RRMC may refer to:

Raven Rock Mountain Complex, a United States government facility in Liberty Township, Pennsylvania, United States
Rogue Regional Medical Center, a hospital in Medford, Oregon, United States
Rapides Regional Medical Center, a hospital in Alexandria, Louisiana, United States
Rolls-Royce Motor Cars, an automotive company in Goodwood, West Sussex, England
Radiobioassay and Radiochemical Measurements Conference